The A3 motorway of Slovenia is 11.3 km long. It begins at the Gabrk interchange on the A1 motorway near Divača and ends at the Italian border at Sežana, continuing on in Italy as the RA14. It connects Ljubljana with Trieste.

Junctions, exits and rest area

European Route(s)

External links
DARS, the national motorway operator of Slovenia.
Exit list of A3

Highways in Slovenia